Mufti Mohammad Sayeed (12 January 1936 – 7 January 2016) was an Indian politician from the state of Jammu and Kashmir. He started in the wing of the National Conference led by G. M. Sadiq, which later merged into the Indian National Congress. He switched to Janata Dal in 1987, eventually founding his own regional party, People's Democratic Party (PDP). He served twice as the Chief Minister of Jammu and Kashmir, during November 2002–November 2005 and March 2015–January 2016. He was also Minister of Tourism in Rajiv Gandhi's cabinet and Home Minister of India in V. P. Singh's cabinet. The PDP continues to be a political force in Jammu and Kashmir, currently led by his daughter Mehbooba Mufti.

Early life
Mufti Sayeed was born on 1936 in Bijbehara town of Anantnag district to a family of clerics. He completed his basic studies in Srinagar and earned his law and postgraduate degree in Arabic from Aligarh Muslim University before entering politics.

Politician and former chief minister of Kashmir Mehbooba Mufti is his daughter.

Political party affiliations
Sayeed started his political career in the 1950s in the Democratic National Conference, a splinter group of the Jammu & Kashmir National Conference led by Ghulam Mohammed Sadiq. He was appointed as the district convenor of the party, which merged back into the National Conference in late 1960.

In 1962, he was elected to the Legislative Assembly from Bijbehara. After G. M. Sadiq became the Chief Minister of the state in 1964, Sayeed was appointed as a Deputy Minister in his government.

In January 1965, the National Conference merged into the Indian National Congress. Thus Sayeed became a member of Congress.

In 1972, Sayeed became a cabinet minister and, the president of the state Congress unit. He is said to have brought about the downfall of the Jammu & Kashmir National Conference government, which was led by Farooq Abdullah, in 1984. He joined the Rajiv Gandhi government in 1986 as Minister of Tourism. In 1987, he quit the Congress party to join V. P. Singh's Jan Morcha, which led to his becoming the first Muslim Minister for Home Affairs in the Union Cabinet of India for one year, from 1989 to 1990.

He rejoined the Congress under P. V. Narasimha Rao, which he left in 1999 along with daughter Mehbooba Mufti to form his own party, the Jammu and Kashmir Peoples Democratic Party.

Political career

Chief Minister: First tenure (2002–2005)

Mohammad Sayeed participated in the 2002 assembly election and won 18 assembly seats for his Peoples Democratic Party. He went on to form a coalition government with the Indian National Congress, and was sworn in as the Chief Minister of Jammu and Kashmir for a term of three years.

In 2003, he merged the autonomous Special Operations Group with the Jammu and Kashmir Police. It was under his tenure which coincided with the peace process led by Indian Prime Ministers Atal Bihari Vajpayee and Manmohan Singh and Pakistani President Pervez Musharraf, with LOC opened for trade and bus service.

Chief Minister: Second tenure (2015–2016)

In the 2014 Jammu and Kashmir Legislative Assembly election, the PDP emerged as the single largest party, though it fell short of a majority. Following a coalition agreement between the BJP and the PDP, Sayeed started his second tenure as the Chief Minister of Jammu and Kashmir in 2015.

Union Minister for Home Affairs
In 1989, within few days of taking office as the Union Minister for Home Affairs, his third daughter, Rubaiya, was kidnapped. She was released in exchange for the release of five terrorist. During his tenure as Home Minister of India the Exodus of Kashmiri Hindus took place.

Attacks on his family and himself

Besides attacks on family members Sayeed also survived attacks on his life by Kashmiri separatists. His daughter Rubaiya Sayeed was also kidnapped on 9 Dec 1989.

Death

On 24 December 2015, Sayeed was admitted to the AIIMS hospital in New Delhi. He suffered from neck pain and fever. His condition gradually deteriorated, and he was put on ventilator support. He died on 7 January 2016 due to multi-organ failure at about 7:30, according to provincial Education Minister and PDP Spokesman Nayeem Akhter. He was just five days short of his 80th birthday when he died.

Reactions to this death came from Prime Minister Narendra Modi, national Home Minister Rajnath Singh at Delhi airport and the 14th Dalai Lama. He was buried at his ancestral burial ground in Bijbehera with state honours. Former Chief Ministers Omar Abdullah and Ghulam Nabi Azad were present at his funeral. Condolences also came from former President Pranab Mukherjee, former deputy prime minister L. K. Advani, Ram Madhav, Delhi Chief Minister Arvind Kejriwal, BJP Vice President Mukhtar Abbas Naqvi, former national Oil Minister Milind Deora, PDP member Rafi Mir and politicians Kalraj Mishra, Jitendra Singh and Ahmed Patel.

According to party member and PDP Chief Spokesperson Mirza Mehboob Beg, the PDP supported his daughter, Mehbooba Mufti, as the next chief minister, while coalition ally BJP expressed "no objection" to her succeeding her father.

Mufti Mohammad Sayeed has been laid to rest in Dara Shikoh Garden Bijbehara.

See also 
 2014 Jammu and Kashmir Legislative Assembly election
 List of Chief Ministers of Jammu and Kashmir
 Jammu and Kashmir Peoples Democratic Party

References

Bibliography

External links

 Official website 
 Biography on J&K PDP website
 The Collaborator: How Mufti Mohammad Sayeed became Delhi’s man in Kashmir

|-

1936 births
2016 deaths
Kashmiri people
Indian Muslims
Chief Ministers of Jammu and Kashmir
People from Bijbehara
Jammu and Kashmir Peoples Democratic Party politicians
V. P. Singh administration
Rajya Sabha members from Jammu and Kashmir
Rajya Sabha members from Uttar Pradesh
Lok Sabha members from Jammu and Kashmir
Ministers of Internal Affairs of India
Jammu and Kashmir MLAs 2014–2018
Aligarh Muslim University alumni
Faculty of Law, Aligarh Muslim University alumni
Chief ministers from Peoples Democratic Party
Indian National Congress politicians
Janata Dal politicians
India MPs 1998–1999
India MPs 1989–1991
Lok Sabha members from Uttar Pradesh
People from Muzaffarnagar